The Tigre River is a Peruvian tributary of the Marañón River west of the Nanay River. It forms from the confluence of the Ecuadorian rivers Cunambo and Pintoyacu at the Peruvian border. Like the Nanay, it flows entirely on the plains. Continuing west from the Tigre along the Marañón River we have the Parinari, Chambira, and Nucuray, all short lowland streams, resembling the Nanay in character. Tigre is Spanish for "tiger" the vernacular name in the region for the Jaguar .

References

Tributaries of the Amazon River
Rivers of Peru
Rivers of Loreto Region
Geography of Pastaza Province